José Lello was a Portuguese politician who served as President of NATO Parliamentary Assembly, Minister and Secretary of State in Cabinet of Portugal and member of Assembly of the Republic of Portugal.

Personal life 
He was born on 18 May 1944 and died on 14 October 2016 by cancer.

Honors and awards

Honors 
 NATO Parliamentary Assembly mourns on his death
 Ministry of Foreign Affairs deeply regretted on his death
 Boavista F.C. put their flag at half mast on his death

Awards 

 Grand Cross of the Order of Infante D. Henrique (Portugal)
 Grand Cross of the Order of Honor (Greece)
 Grand Cross of the Order of Rio Branco (Brazil)
 Grand Cruz do Cruzeiro do Sul (Brazil)
 Grand Cross of the Order of Leopold II (Belgium)
 Grand Cross of the Order of Merit (R.F.A.)
 Grand Cross of the Order of Civil Merit (Spain)
 Grand Collar of the Order of the Liberator (Venezuela)
 Aguilla Azteca - Grade Banda (Mexico)
 Grand Collar of the Wissan Alavita Order and Officer of the Wissan Alavita Order (Morocco)
 Grand Officer of Merit (France)
 Grand Officer of the Order of Merit (Luxembourg)

References 

1944 births
2016 deaths

Year of birth missing
NATO officials
Members of the NATO Parliamentary Assembly